The Saint Petersburg Declaration of 1868 or in full Declaration Renouncing the Use, in Time of War, of Explosive Projectiles Under 400 Grammes Weight is an international treaty agreed in Saint Petersburg, Russian Empire, November 29 / December 11, 1868. It succeeded the First Geneva Convention of 1864. It was a predecessor of the well-known Hague Conventions of 1899 and 1907.

It was signed by the members of the International Military Commission convened for this purpose in the presence of the Imperial Cabinet of Russia.

History

In 1863, the Russian Army had perfected a fulminating musketball that could explode when it hit a hard target and was designed to blow up powder magazines or ammunition wagons. At the same time several similar projectiles for the same purposes were developed in America, the best one known being the Gardiner's Explosive Bullet, and both sides used them in the US Civil War, inflicting horrible wounds when aimed at people, and that, in turn, caused a public backlash against the weapon. In 1867, Russians perfected an improved explosive musketball that would detonate on any impact after being fired, even soft targets like people or animals. Predicting the disastrous effect of such a discovery on diplomatic relations with their neighbors, Russia decided to negotiate a ban on the development, creation, and use of such weapons before a grisly arms race commenced.

Upon the invitation of the Russian diplomat and statesman Prince Alexander Gorchakov, for the purpose of considering the existing rules of war, a conference of delegates met at Saint Petersburg, Russian Empire, in December 1868.

The nations represented were  Austria-Hungary, Bavaria, Belgium, Denmark, France, United Kingdom (representing the British Empire), Greece, Italy, the Netherlands, Persia, Portugal, Prussia and the North German Confederation (i.e., Greater Prussia), Russia, Sweden-Norway, Switzerland, the Ottoman Empire, and Württemberg. The United States, not considered a major power at the time, was not invited and took no part in the convention. Baden and Brazil ratified the agreement in 1869.

The delegates affirmed that the only legitimate object of war should be to weaken the military force of the enemy, which could be sufficiently accomplished by the employment of highly destructive weapons.  With that fact established, the delegates agreed to prohibit the use of less deadly explosives that might merely injure the combatants and thereby create prolonged suffering of such combatants.

The Great Powers agreed to renounce, in case of war among themselves, the use "by their military or naval troops of any projectile of a weight below 400 grams (14 ounces avoirdupois), which is either explosive or charged with fulminating or inflammable substances."

While the declaration bans the use of fragmenting, explosive, or incendiary small arms ammunition, it does not prohibit such ammunition for use in autocannon or artillery rounds. 
   
The influence of this declaration on international humanitarian law were elucidated in the Japanese case Ryuichi Shimoda et al. v. The State (1963):

Notes
Ammunition for anti-materiel rifles and heavy machine-guns with a bore of about 12.7 mm to 14.5 mm in diameter straddle the definition between small arms and heavy weapons. Large-bore rifles using high-explosive or incendiary rounds run the risk of violating the Declaration despite the legal use (as specified in the Hague Conventions of 1899 and 1907) of such special munitions in heavy machineguns and autocannons. The discussion of their legality often revolves around the weight limitation and whether it applies to the weight of the bullet itself or to the entire fixed cartridge.
The distinction between "explosive" and "fulminating" bullets is academic but important.
An "explosive" bullet contains an explosive filler that detonates on impact.
A "fulminating" bullet contains a small unstable high explosive charge and is designed to shatter into fragments after impact or inside the wound. They also have the added potential of detonating when jarred or while being removed, complicating first aid or surgery.
The Declaration bans such munitions during wars only among the co-signatory European and Eurasian nations. It notably leaves out instances of war with non-signatory nations, conflicts with undeveloped nations, or military operations in their own colonies and possessions.

References

External links
 Saint Petersburg Declaration of 1868 at International Committee of the Red Cross website.
WWI Document Archive: Conventions and Treaties
 WWI Document Archive > Saint Petersburg Declaration Renouncing the Use, in Time of War, of Certain Explosive Projectiles

International humanitarian law treaties
1868 in military history
1868 treaties
1868 in the Russian Empire
Treaties of Austria-Hungary
Treaties of the Grand Duchy of Baden
Treaties of the Kingdom of Bavaria
Treaties of Belgium
Treaties of the Empire of Brazil
Treaties of Denmark
Treaties of Estonia
Treaties of the Second French Empire
Treaties of the Kingdom of Greece
Treaties of the Netherlands
Treaties of the Kingdom of Italy (1861–1946)
Treaties of the Qajar dynasty
Treaties of the Kingdom of Portugal
Treaties of the Kingdom of Prussia
Treaties of the North German Confederation
Treaties of the Russian Empire
Treaties of the United Kingdoms of Sweden and Norway
Treaties of Switzerland
Treaties of the Ottoman Empire
Treaties of the United Kingdom (1801–1922)
Treaties of the Kingdom of Württemberg